Gerard Lyttle (born 27 November 1977, in Belfast) is a Northern Irish football manager and former football player. He is the former manager of League of Ireland Premier Division club Sligo Rovers.

Playing career
A right-sided or central midfielder, he began his youth career with Star Of The Sea before signing a professional contract with Celtic in December 1994 where he entered the youth team pool. After a further transitional season in 1994–95, Lyttle made more frequent U-18 appearances the following year and moved up to the reserves ahead of the 1996–97 season. Following a season at that level, Lyttle moved on loan to Swindon Town in July 1997. His time at the club was cut short by injury and he returned to Celtic to make more reserve appearances throughout 1997–98.

Lyttle departed Celtic in 1998 and signed for Peterborough United. He again struggled to make inroads into the first team after a single League Cup outing in August 1998 against Reading. Lyttle negotiated a switch to non-league Kingstonian but again managed only a single appearance on 4 December 1999. After seeing out 1999–00 with a spell at Northampton Town, a return to Northern Ireland beckoned at the end of the season.

Lyttle went on to play for Irish League sides Ballymena United, Newry City, Cliftonville, Lisburn Distillery and Cliftonville again, before dropping into the junior ranks with Newington YC in 2006.

Throughout his playing career, Lyttle was capped 8 times for Northern Ireland U21s, and also received caps at U16 and U18 level.

Managerial career
Lyttle took charge of junior club Malachians in 2009. He then joined the coaching set-up at Cliftonville, taking temporary charge following Tommy Breslin's resignation in September 2015. He was awarded the post permanently the following month and led the club to victory in the 2015–16 Northern Ireland Football League Cup. Lyttle resigned in April 2017 to take the post of full-time manager at Sligo Rovers and steered them to safety in his first season in charge with a 9th place finish. Lyttle left Sligo Rovers in October 2018.

References

1977 births
Living people
Football managers from Northern Ireland
Peterborough United F.C. players
Association football midfielders
Association footballers from Northern Ireland